A bar journal is a trade magazine published by a bar association, a lawyers association.

See also
ABA Journal
Law review

References

Legal magazines
Professional and trade magazines